Ismail Ahmedani (1930–2007) (اسماعیل احمدانی) was a Saraiki novelist, fiction writer, and promoter of the Saraiki language.

Life

He was born 1 January 1930 in a small village "Khoi" in Rajanpur District, British India (now Pakistan).

His father Muhammad Moosa Khan was a writer and teacher. He earned a BA in art from Dera Ghazi Khan after which Ismail Ahmedani started his life as a teacher from Bahawal pur  and then Khan pur district Rahim Yar Khan.

He wrote a travelogue named Peet de Pandh (travel of love) and won an award for this writing.  He wrote his autobiography named Yadden De Kak Muhal (places of memories). In 2013 he was again awarded the Khwaja Ghulam Farid award for literature in the Saraiki language for this autobiography.

Published books
Peet Dey Pandh(پیت دے پندہ)A travelogue from Sanghar to Fort Manro(Awarded), Publisher:	Rasūlpūr, Z̤ilaʻ Ḍerah G̲h̲āzī K̲h̲ān : Sirāʼekī Pablīkeshanz ; Baḥāvalpūr : Milne kā patah, Sirāʼekī Lāʼibrerī, (1980)
Chuoliyan(چولیاں) A novel about Existentialism . (Awarded)
Amar Kahaani(امر کہانی) A novel about Saraiki movement
Yadeen de kaak Mahal(یادین دی کاک محل) Autobiography (Awarded)

Unpublished books
Hakra wal wahse(حاکرا ول واسی) DramaMoona leza dii Murk''(مونالیزا دی مرک) A collection of eleven fictions

References

1930 births
2007 deaths
Baloch people
Pakistani scholars
Pakistani dramatists and playwrights
Saraiki people
People from Rajanpur District
People from Sanghar District
University of Sindh alumni
Saraiki-language writers